The Woodstock Film Festival is an American film festival that was launched in 2000 by filmmakers Meira Blaustein and Laurent Rejto with the goal to bring high quality independent film to the Hudson Valley region. The festival takes place each fall in the towns of Woodstock, Rosendale, Saugerties and Kingston, in the height of fall foliage.

The Woodstock Film Festival is a not-for-profit, 501(c)(3) organization. The Woodstock Film Festival is an Oscar®-qualifying festival in the short film categories - Live Action Short Film, Animated Short Film, and Documentary Short Film.

History
With offices located in the heart of Woodstock, NY, the first fiercely independent inaugural festival ran September 21–24, 2000. It included workshops, documentaries, concerts and films from all over the world. Speakers at the inaugural festival's workshops included actor Aidan Quinn, documentary filmmakers Albert Maysles, Barbara Kopple and D. A. Pennebaker, filmmaker Les Blank and Ron Nyswaner, who wrote the screenplay for Philadelphia.

Now in its 23rd year, the Woodstock Film Festival has garnered the praise of the film industry and is noted as being "one of the top 50 film festivals in the world." Programming approximately 125 films, concerts, panels and parties each year, WFF draws films from the far reaches of Siberia and Kazakhstan to locally shot films right in the Hudson Valley, NY. With categories of programming such as; shorts, animation, music videos, focus on music, exposure, world cinema and Hudson Valley films.

The 2022 Woodstock Film Festival took place from September 28 - October 2 2022.

Notable attendees
The festival has featured many high-powered members of the film community. These have included industry executives, network and cable executives, record label executives, writers, entertainment lawyers, producers, and critics. Some notable attendees have included Natalie Portman, Jennifer Connelly, Darren Aronofsky, Kevin Bacon, Keanu Reeves, Steve Buscemi, Matt Dillon, Olympia Dukakis, Woody Harrelson, Ethan Hawke, Daniel Day-Lewis, Laura Linney, Parker Posey, Aidan Quinn, Kevin Smith, Tim Robbins, Tim Blake Nelson, Ellen Barkin, Vincent D'Onofrio, Vera Farmiga, Jonathan Demme, Timothy Hutton, Julie Taymor, Lori Singer, Awkwafina, Melissa Leo, Judd Hirsch and Mark Ruffalo.

Advisory board
The Woodstock Film Festival advisory board is made up of top industry representatives including Judy Arthur, Eamonn Bowles, Robin Bronk, Ellen Chenoweth, Claude Dal Farra, Vincent D'Onofrio, Griffin Dunne, Martha Frankel, Leon Gast, Tim Gorski, Jonathan Gray, Ethan Hawke, Sabine Hoffman, Jennifer Hicks, Gill Holland, Ted Hope, Michael Lang, Melissa Leo, Jeremiah Newton, Stephen Nemeth, Annie Nocenti, Ron Nyswaner, Bill Plympton, Aidan Quinn, Peter Saraf, Steve Savage, Liev Schreiber, Zachary Sklar, John Sloss, Fisher Stevens, David Strathairn, and Lemore Syvan.

Awards presented

The Woodstock Film Festival is a competitive festival that offers cash and in-kind prizes in a variety of categories.
The festival's "Maverick Awards," held the Saturday night of the festival are given for:

Honorary Maverick Award 
Best Feature Narrative
Best Feature Documentary 
Best Short Documentary
Best Narrative
Best Student Short
Best Cinematography–The Haskell Wexler Award
Best Editing
Best Animated Short
Audience Award for Best Feature Narrative
Audience Award for Best Feature Documentary

Maverick Award Honorees
The Honorary Maverick Award is given each year to a fixture in the world of film, typically veteran directors, actors or industry professionals who have left their permanent mark on entertainment. Past recipients have included:

Actor Ethan Hawke (2022), Director Roger Ross Williams (2021), Director of Theater and Film Julie Taymor (2018), Actress Susan Sarandon (2017), Director Alejandro Gonzālez Iñárritu (2016), Director Atom Egoyan (2015), Director Darren Aronofsky (2014), Director Peter Bogdanovich (2013), Director Jonathan Demme (2012), Director Tony Kaye (2011), Director Bruce Beresford (2010), Director Richard Linklater (2009), Comedian, Director Kevin Smith (2008), Producer Christine Vachon (2007), Filmmaker Barbara Kopple (2006), Actor Steve Buscemi (2005), Director Mira Nair (2004), Actor Woody Harrelson (2003), Actor Tim Robbins (2002), D.A. Pennebaker and Chris Hegedus (2001), Filmmaker Les Blank (2000)

Trailblazer recipients have included professionals in the entertainment industry who have made an impact in their craft. Past recipients have included CEO & Founder of NEON Tom Quinn (2021), Robin Bronk CEO of the Creative Coalition (2011), marketing and distribution guru Bob Berney (2010), Ted Hope (2009), James Schamus (2008), Ted Sarandos (2007), Jonathan Sehring (2006), John Sloss (2005).

Year-Round Programming

The Woodstock Film Festival continues the spread of independent film year round with film screenings and events like the annual Taste of Woodstock Event.

2018 was the inaugural year of the Woodstock Film Festival's Youth Film Lab.

The festival holds a yearly Career Day, focused on bringing direct insight from the film world to aspiring students.

Award Winners 2022
BEST NARRATIVE FEATURE WINNER : AMERIKATSI 

BEST DOCUMENTARY FEATURE WINNER : LAST FLIGHT HOME 

ULTRA INDIE AWARD WINNER : HANNAH HA HA

BEST SHORTS INCLUDE: MOSHARI FOR SHORT NARRATIVE; AS FAR AS THEY CAN RUN FOR BEST SHORT DOC & BUZZKILL FOR BEST ANIMATION

Honorary award recipients included Ethan Hawke, Awkwafina, Leave No Trace director Debra Granik and IFC Films president Arianna Bocco

References

External links
 

Film festivals in New York (state)
Film festivals established in 1999